Corey Hanson (born 11 August 1992) is a Jamaica international rugby league footballer who last played for the Hemel Stags in Betfred League 1.

Background
Hanson was born in Sheffield, South Yorkshire, England.

Career

He started his career at Sheffield Eagles, where he made his début for the club in the 2010 season, having progressed through the club's academy.

International career
In 2011, Corey was called up to the Jamaica squad, for their World Cup Qualifiers against South Africa and USA. Corey was chosen to play in both matches, and scored Jamaica's only try in their defeat by the USA.

Corey received another call up in 2013, and scored his second try for Jamaica in their 38-14 defeat by Canada.

Corey was again called up in 2014, and again scored a try and added a conversion in Jamaica's narrow 24-20 defeat by Canada.

In 2015, Corey played for Jamaica in their 2017 Rugby League World Cup qualifying campaign.

References

External links
 Sheffield Eagles

1992 births
Living people
Doncaster R.L.F.C. players
English people of Jamaican descent
Jamaican rugby league players
English rugby league players
Gloucestershire All Golds players
Hemel Stags players
Jamaica national rugby league team captains
Jamaica national rugby league team players
Rugby league centres
Rugby league locks
Rugby league players from Sheffield
Rugby league second-rows
Sheffield Eagles players
York City Knights players